Tamil Nadu State Film Awards were given for excellence in Tamil cinema in India. They were given annually to honour the best talents and provide encouragement and incentive to the South Indian film industry by the Government of Tamil Nadu. The awards were decided by a committee headed by a Judge. The awards were first given in 1967 and discontinued after 1970. The awards were given again in 1977 and continued till 1982. The awards were not given in the years 1971 to 1976. However, in the year 1977, the awards for Best Actress and Best Actor were announced for the years 1971 to 1976 by way of honorary certificates by the government led by the then chief minister M.G.Ramachandran. Since 1988, the awards were regularly given until it became defunct in 2008.

After winning the election for the Producers Council of Tamil cinema, the chairman Vishal revealed that he would approach the government to reinstate the awards. The awards were reinstated in July 2017 after the government announced the wins for 2009–2014.

Awards

Awards are given in the following categories. Follow the links for lists of the award winners, year by year.

Creative awards
 Best Film: since 1967
 Best Director: since 1967
 Best Family Film:2000 and 2001; since 2006
 Best Film Portraying Woman in Good Light: since 1994
 Best Actor: since 1967
 Best Actress: since 1967	
 Best Supporting Actor: 1968 to 1970; since 2000
 Best Supporting Actress: 1968 to 1970; since 2000
 Best Villain: since 1995
 Best Comedian: 1980 to 1982; since 1995
 Best Child Artist: 1969 and 1970; 1977 and 1978; 1990; since 1994
 Best Music Director: 1968 to 1970; 1977 to 1982; since 1988
 Best Male Playback Singer: 1968 to 1970; 1977 to 1982; since 1988
 Best Female Playback Singer: 1968 to 1970; 1977 to 1982; since 1988

Technical awards
 Best Stunt Coordinator: 1970; 1982; since 1988
 Best Art Director: since 1988
 Best Cinematographer: 1968 to 1970; 1977 to 1982; since 1988
 Best Choreographer: since 1988
 Best Audiographer: since 1988
 Best Lyricist: 1968 to 1970; 1977 to 1982; since 1988
 Best Male Dubbing Artist: since 2000
 Best Female Dubbing Artist: since 2000
 Best Editor: 1980 to 1982; since 1988
 Best Storywriter: 1968 to 1970; 1977 to 1982; since 1988
 Best Dialogue Writer: 1968 to 1970; 1977 to 1982; since 1988
 Best Make-up Artist: since 1993
 Best Costume Designer: since 1993

Special awards
 Special Prizes: since 1970
 Honorary Award: since 1988

Retired awards
 Best Male Debut – Karthik for Alaigal Oivathillai: 1981
 Best Female Debut – Radha for Alaigal Oivathillai: 1981

See also
 Cinema of India

References

 
Tamil cinema
Awards established in 1967
Tamil film awards
Indian film awards
1967 establishments in Madras State
Tamil Nadu awards